The Moy and Charlemont LTC Tournament was a Victorian era grass court tennis tournament staged only one time in October 1878. first held at the Moy and Charlemont Croquet and Lawn Tennis Club, Moy, County Tyrone, Northern Ireland.

History
The Moy and Charlemont LTC Tournament was an late Victorian period grass court tennis tournament staged only one time in October 1878. The gentleman's singles event was won by Mr. Robert Baron Templer who defeated Mr. S. Phipson Templer. A gentleman's doubles event was also staged that was won by Mr. S. Phipson and William Lyle who defeated  Mr. Irvine and Captain Richardson.

References

Defunct tennis tournaments in the United Kingdom
Grass court tennis tournaments